Peter Wentworth Bucknell (born 1967) is a filmmaker, author and classical violist residing in Barcelona.

Film
Known best for his underwater films, Bucknell is a commercial and documentary film maker. In 2014 he wrote The Underwater GoPro Book: an instructional book on the use of the GoPro. He is an underwater cameraman known for his work on New York's shipwrecks and in Mexico's caves.

Performing arts
Author of Violin is Easy, a pedagogical book for teachers and students, Bucknell began in the performing arts as a classical musician. He performed the Australian premiere, broadcast live by the Australian Broadcasting Corporation, of Chaconne for Viola and Orchestra by Michael Colgrass. He performed and recorded as solo violist with Apollo's Fire, the Los Angeles Baroque Orchestra, Les Concerts du Monde, and Los Angeles Musica Viva. He was the principal violist with the Rebel Baroque Orchestra from 1998 - 2009. He appeared as a guest on Jim Henson's The Ghost of Faffner Hall as a member of the Como String Quartet in 1988.

As a member of the Danel Quartet, specialising in the string quartets of Dmitri Shostakovich, Bucknell has appeared at Wigmore Hall and in many other European halls, and on Radio France. As a member of the Stradivari Sextet, Bucknell was loaned the "Mahler Stradivarius."

He was a founding member of the Raw Fish Quartet performing at the George Crumb Festival in New York, concerts in Taiwan and La Jolla and at the Santa Fe Chamber Music Festival, playing George Crumb's Black Angels and Steve Reich's Different Trains. He was a member of the Munich Chamber Orchestra, he recorded with Concerto Köln, and performed with Musica Antiqua Köln.

Background
A documentary film maker, Bucknell is known for his factual short films and environmental films shot underwater. A classical viola player, Bucknell was for several years the Professor of viola at the Crane School of Music, State University of New York at Potsdam.

Bucknell's early studies on violin were with Russian pedagogue Nelli Shkolnikova. In 1991 he won the Auckland International Viola Congress Competition and the Queen Elizabeth II Silver Jubilee Award. His Quartet won the Interpretation Prize in the Osaka International Chamber Music Competition.

He studied music in Melbourne at the Victorian College of the Arts with Nathan Gutman; in Los Angeles, California with violist Donald McInness; in Siena, Italy at the Accademia Musicale Chigiana with Yuri Bashmet; and in Cologne, Germany with Rainer Moog, a student of Walter Trampler at the Juilliard School, the principal violist of the Berlin Philharmonic Orchestra under Herbert von Karajan.

Bucknell holds a Bachelor of Economics and Commerce degree from the University of Melbourne and a Doctor of Music degree from the State University of New York at Stony Brook where he studied with professor Mitchell Stern.

Bucknell is the son of Tasmanian-born painter Toni Bucknell of Melbourne, Australia. He is married to mezzo-soprano Rinat Shaham.

Discography
Recordings include two chamber music CDs on the classical music label, Musica Omnia, with the Atlantis Trio and the Atlantis Ensemble: 
 Felix Mendelssohn's Piano trio No. 1, Op.49 and Piano sextet, Op. 110
 Robert Schumann's Piano Quintet Op. 44, Franz Schubert's Trout Quintet and song "Die Forelle." (Eighth release in "The Romantics" series.)

See also
 Early music
 Baroque music
 Historically informed performance

References

External links
 History of la Grange de Meslay 
 
 Osaka International Chamber Music Competition

1967 births
Living people
Stony Brook University alumni
People educated at Trinity College (University of Melbourne)
University of Melbourne alumni
Australian classical violists
Australian filmmakers